Ryan Owens  (born 29 September 1995) is a British male track cyclist, representing Great Britain at international competitions. He won a silver medal at the 2020 Tokyo Olympic Games in the Men's Team Sprint alongside Jack Carlin and Jason Kenny

At the 2018 Commonwealth Games, Owens won Silver in the team sprint event alongside Joseph Truman and Philip Hindes.

Owens is a four time British team champion after winning the Team Sprint Championship at the 2017 British National Track Championships, 2018 British National Track Championships,  and 2020 British National Track Championships. and the Individual Sprint title at the 2017 British National Track Championships

Major results

2016
 UCI Track Cycling World Cup
1st  Team sprint, Round 1 (Glasgow)
1st  Team sprint, Round 2 (Apeldoorn)
 UEC European Track Championships
2nd  Team sprint
2017
 British National Track Championships
1st  Team sprint
1st  Individual Sprint
 UCI Track Cycling World Cup
3rd  Team Sprint, Round 1 (Pruszków)
 UCI Track Cycling World Championships
4th Individual Sprint
2018
 2018 British National Track Championships
1st  Team sprint
 UCI Track Cycling World Championships
2nd  Team Sprint
 2018 Commonwealth Games
2nd  Team Sprint
 UCI Track Cycling World Cup
2nd  Team Sprint, Round 2 (Berlin)
2nd  Team Sprint, Round 4 (London)
3rd  Team Sprint, Round 1 (Milton, Ontario)
2019
 UEC European Championships
2nd  Team Sprint
 UCI Track Cycling World Cup
2nd  Team Sprint, Round 1 (Minsk)
2nd  Team Sprint, Round 2 (Glasgow)
 2019 European Games
3rd  Team Sprint
2020
 British National Track Championships
1st  Team sprint
 UCI Track Cycling World Championships
2nd  Team Sprint
2021
Tokyo 2020 Olympic Games
2nd  Team Sprint

References

External links

1995 births
Living people
British male cyclists
British track cyclists
Sportspeople from Leeds
Commonwealth Games medallists in cycling
Commonwealth Games silver medallists for England
Cyclists at the 2018 Commonwealth Games
Cyclists at the 2019 European Games
European Games medalists in cycling
European Games bronze medalists for Great Britain
Cyclists at the 2020 Summer Olympics
Olympic cyclists of Great Britain
Medalists at the 2020 Summer Olympics
Olympic silver medallists for Great Britain
Olympic medalists in cycling
English Olympic medallists
Cyclists at the 2022 Commonwealth Games
Commonwealth Games competitors for England
Medallists at the 2018 Commonwealth Games
Medallists at the 2022 Commonwealth Games